Daniel Elliott Huger (1779–1854) was a U.S. Senator from South Carolina. Senator Huger may also refer to:

Benjamin Huger (congressman) (1768–1823), South Carolina State Senate
Francis Kinloch Huger (1773–1855), South Carolina State Senate